Holland's Leaguer was the name of a Dutch English brothel in London between 1603 and January 1632. It has been referred to as the most famed brothel in 17th-century England. "Legeur" means military encampment.

It was an expensive establishment with King James I of England and George Villiers, 1st Duke of Buckingham, among its clients. The brothel was owned and managed by Elizabeth "Bess" Holland. She may have been married to one of the Holland family, notorious figures in the Elizabethan underworld. Popular rumour linked the house specifically with Dutch prostitutes. The brothel modelled itself on the Schoen Majken (The Lovely Little Maiden) in Brussels. It provided luxurious surroundings, good food, clean linen and 'modern' plumbing.

Location
Holland's Leaguer was located in a former manor house in Old Paris Garden, Southwark, by the Thames. Located in Bankside, part of the Liberty of the Clink it was beyond the control of the London civil authorities. The manor house, once owned by the Knights Templar, was leased to Holland by Lord Hunsden in 1603. It was surrounded by a moat and had a drawbridge and portcullis. Although Henry VIII had suppressed the Bankside whorehouses in the 1540s, this was only a temporary measure.

London apprentices
The brothel was a topical subject in 1631, because it had been attacked and damaged during the annual Shrove Tuesday tumult by the London apprentices. Shrove Tuesday (the day before Ash Wednesday) was the 'prentices' holiday, and they often celebrated by running wild and causing destruction. (The Cockpit Theatre was damaged in their Shrove Tuesday rioting on 4 March 1617.) Brothels were a regular target of the 'prentices.

Closure
In December 1631, Charles I of England gave order of its closure and sent soldiers there to perform the order. Bess Holland raised the bridge over the moat, causing the soldiers to fall in the water, after which the brothel workers emptied their pots over them. The brothel was besieged for a month until it was finally closed in January 1632. Holland fled and opened another brothel elsewhere.

In contemporary media
The siege of Holland's Leaguer was portrayed in the pamphlet Holland's Leaguer by Nicholas Goodman, the play Holland's Leaguer by Shackerley Marmion, and the ballad "News from Holland's Leaguer" by Lawrence Price. It is also mentioned in the song "The Jolly Broom Man" by Richard Crimsal where an ex-soldier lists his many achievements in battle but concludes that his service at the Leaguer "proved too hot".

References

Bibliography
 
 
 
 
 
 
 
 
 
 
 

17th century in London
Brothels in the United Kingdom
1603 in England
1632 in England
Prostitution in England